The Lancashire Combination was a football league founded in the North West of England in 1891–92. It absorbed the Lancashire League in 1903. In 1968 the Combination lost five of its clubs to the newly formed Northern Premier League. In 1982 it was finally merged with the Cheshire County League to form the North West Counties League.

Champions

Member clubs
A total of 190 clubs and reserve teams played in the Lancashire Combination:

Accrington
Accrington Stanley (modern)
Accrington Stanley (original)
Accrington Stanley reserves
ACI Horwich
Altrincham
Ashton Athletic
Ashton Town
Ashton United
Astley & Tyldesley Collieries
Astley Bridge
Astley Bridge Wanderers
Atherton
Atherton Collieries
Bacup Borough
Bacup Borough reserves
Bangor City
Barnoldswick & District
Barnoldswick Town
Barnoldswick United
Barrow
Barrow reserves
Bell's Temperance
Berry's Association
Black Lane Temperance
Blackburn Park Road
Blackburn Rovers reserves
Blackburn Rovers 'A'
Blackpool 'B'
Blackpool Mechanics
Blackpool reserves
Bolton ST
Bolton St Lukes
Bolton Wanderers 'B'
Bolton Wanderers reserves
Bootle
Bootle Athletic
Brynn Central
Burnley 'A'
Burnley reserves
Burscough
Burscough Rangers
Burscough reserves
Bury reserves
Caernarfon Town
Carlisle United
Chadderton
Chester

Chorley
Chorley reserves
Chorley St George's
Clitheroe
Colne
Colne Dynamoes
Colne Town
Corinthians
Crewe Alexandra reserves
Cromptons Recreation
Daisy Hill
Darwen
Darwen reserves
De Havilland
Denton
Dick, Kerr's
Droylsden
Droylsden United
Dukinfield Town
Earlestown
Eccles United
Ellesmere Port Town
Everton reserves
Failsworth
Fleetwood
Fleetwood Rangers
Fleetwood reserves
Ford Motors
Formby
Glossop North End
Glossop North End reserves
Great Harwood
Great Harwood reserves
Great Harwood Town
Guinness Exports
Halliwell
Haslingden
Hebden Bridge
Heywood
Heywood United
Hindley
Hindley Central
Hindley Green Athletic
Hindsford
Horwich RMI
Horwich RMI reserves
Hyde
Hurst Ramblers

Hyde St George's
Kirkby Town
Kirkby Town reserves
Lancaster City
Lancaster City reserves
Leyland
Leyland Motors
Little Lever
Liverpool reserves
Liverpool Stanley
Lomax
Lomond
Lostock Hall
Lucas Sports
Lytham
Macclesfield
Maghull
Manchester Central
Manchester City reserves
Manchester North End
Manchester Polytechnic
Manchester United reserves
Marine
Morecambe
Morecambe reserves
Nantwich
Nelson
Nelson reserves
Netherfield
Netherfield reserves
New Brighton
New Brighton reserves
New Brighton Tower reserves
Newton Heath Athletic
Newton-le-Willows
Northern Meols
Northern Nomads
Northwich Victoria
Oldham Athletic
Oldham Athletic reserves
Oldham Athletic 'A'
Oldham Dew
Oswaldtwistle Rovers
Oswestry United
Padiham
Pendlebury
Plank Lane
Portsmouth Rovers

Port Sunlight
Prescot Cables
Prescot Cables reserves
Prescot
Preston North End 'A'
Preston North End reserves
Prestwich Heys
Radcliffe Borough
Rawtenstall
Rochdale
Rochdale reserves
Rolls Royce
Rossendale United
Rossendale United reserves
Royton
St Anne's Athletic
St Helens Recreation
St Helens Town
Skerton
Skelmersdale United
Skelmersdale United reserves
South Liverpool
Southport Central
Southport reserves
Stalybridge Celtic
Stalybridge Celtic reserves
Stalybridge Rovers
Stockport County reserves
Stubshaw Cross Rovers
Tranmere Rovers
Tranmere Rovers reserves
Turton
Tyldesley Albion
Vulcan Institute
Vulcan Newton
Walkden Central
Whitworth Valley
Wigan Athletic
Wigan Athletic reserves
Wigan Borough
Wigan Borough reserves
Wigan Rovers
Wigan Town
Witton Albion
Workington
Wren Rovers

References

External links
Full list of Lancashire Combination league tables RSSSF

 
Football in Lancashire
North West Counties Football League
Defunct football leagues in England
1891 establishments in England
1982 disestablishments in England
Sports leagues established in 1891
Sports leagues disestablished in 1982